Bulbophyllum subligaculiferum is a species of orchid in the genus Bulbophyllum endemic to the forests of Cameroon and Gabon. Unfortunately, as a result of its decreasing population, it has been listed as 'Endangered' under criteria B2ab(iii,v) of the IUCN Red List of Threatened Species 2018.

References

The Bulbophyllum-Checklist
The Internet Orchid Species Photo Encyclopedia

subligaculiferum